Henrik Herbert Agerbeck (born 10 September 1956), known as Henrik Agerbeck, is a Danish former football player in the striker position. He started his career with Kjøbenhavns Boldklub, with whom won the 1974 Danish 1st Division championship. He then played professionally with German club Hertha BSC and a number of clubs in French football, winning the 1982–83 French Division 1 championship with FC Nantes. He played four games for the Denmark national football team.

Honours
1974 Danish 1st Division
1982–83 French Division 1

References

External links
 Danish national team profile 
 

1956 births
Living people
Danish men's footballers
Denmark international footballers
Expatriate footballers in Germany
Danish expatriate men's footballers
Bundesliga players
Hertha BSC players
Ligue 1 players
Ligue 2 players
FC Nantes players
FC Sochaux-Montbéliard players
Kjøbenhavns Boldklub players
Expatriate footballers in France
Association football forwards
Calais RUFC players
USL Dunkerque players
Sportspeople from Frederiksberg